"The Adventure of Wisteria Lodge" is one of the fifty-six Sherlock Holmes short stories written by Arthur Conan Doyle.  One of eight stories in the volume His Last Bow, it is a lengthy, two-part story consisting of "The Singular Experience of Mr. John Scott Eccles" and "The Tiger of San Pedro", which on original publication in The Strand bore the collective title of "A Reminiscence of Mr. Sherlock Holmes".

Synopsis

The Singular Experience of Mr. John Scott Eccles
Holmes is visited by a perturbed proper English gentleman, John Scott Eccles, who wishes to discuss something "grotesque". No sooner has he arrived at 221B Baker Street than Inspector Gregson also shows up, along with Inspector Baynes of the Surrey Constabulary. They wish a statement from Eccles about the murder near Esher last night. A note in the dead man's pocket indicates that Eccles said that he would be at the victim's house that night.

Eccles is shocked to hear of Aloysius Garcia being beaten to death. Yes, he spent the night at Wisteria Lodge, Garcia's rented house, but when he woke up in the morning, he found that Garcia and his servants had all disappeared. He was alone in an empty house. He last remembers seeing Garcia at about one o'clock in the morning when he came to Eccles's room to ask if he had rung.

Eccles met Garcia, a Spaniard, through an acquaintance, and seemed to form an unlikely friendship right away. Garcia invited Eccles to stay at his house for a few days, but when Eccles arrived there, he could tell that something was amiss. Garcia seemed distracted by something, and the whole mood of the visit seemed quite sombre. Indeed, Garcia's mood became even darker once his servant handed him a note that evening.

Eccles left Wisteria Lodge and inquired about the place at the estate agent's, and was surprised to find that the rent on the house had been paid in full. Odder still, no-one at the Spanish Embassy in London had heard of Garcia.

Inspector Baynes produces the note that Eccles saw Garcia receive. It reads "Our own colours, green and white. Green open, white shut. Main stair, first corridor, seventh right, green baize. Godspeed. D.", in a woman's handwriting. Could it have been a tryst? Could a jealous husband be behind Garcia's death?

It emerges that Baynes has deduced that Garcia's body had been lying out in the open since one o'clock, but Eccles says that this is impossible, as Garcia came to his room about then. Holmes theorizes that Garcia may have tampered with the clocks to get Eccles to bed earlier than he thought it was, and that the whole business of coming to his room and making a point of mentioning that it was one o'clock—when it was probably much earlier—was likely aimed at setting up an alibi, but for what?

All that Holmes can deduce is that the murderer lives near Wisteria Lodge, and in a big house.

The Tiger of San Pedro

Holmes and Dr. Watson go to Esher to see Wisteria Lodge with Inspector Baynes. The constable guarding the house reports a hair-raising experience. A brutish-looking man—the devil himself, thought the constable—looked in the window. The constable gave chase, but the intruder got away. Holmes establishes by the footmarks that the constable did not imagine this.

Inside the house, a number of odd items are to be seen: something resembling a mummified baby, a bird torn to pieces, a pail of blood, and a platter full of charred bones. Holmes later links these to voodoo, providing an important clue.

Suddenly, however, five days after the murder, Holmes is astonished to read in the newspaper that Baynes has arrested someone, Garcia's cook, the brutish fellow who had given the constable such a start. He provides little information, though—only grunts. Holmes is sure that the cook is not the murderer, and warns Baynes. Baynes, however, declines Holmes's assistance and advice.

Holmes spends the next day reconnoitering the local country houses, and finds one of interest, the Henderson household, whose master has obviously spent time in the tropics, and whose secretary, Lucas, is a dark-skinned foreigner. Mr. Henderson's two girls have an English governess named Burnet. Holmes also learns from a sacked gardener that Henderson is rich and scared of something, although no one can say what. Nor can anyone say where he came from. Henderson is also violent.

Holmes believes that the cryptic note came from this household, High Gable, and the writer could only be Miss Burnet, who has not been seen since the night of the murder. Holmes decides to go to High Gable, at night, to see whether he can "strike at the very heart of the mystery." He does not get the chance.

John Warner, the sacked gardener, comes in and announces that the Hendersons have fled by train, and tried to take Miss Burnet with them. He, however, wrestled her into a cab and brought her to the inn where Holmes and Watson are staying. She was obviously unwilling to go with Henderson for she had been drugged with opium.

"Henderson" has also been identified, by Inspector Baynes. He is Don Juan Murillo, the Tiger of San Pedro, a hated and feared overthrown dictator from Central America. It turns out that Garcia, who was from San Pedro, not Spain, got himself killed in a revenge plot. Miss Burnet was also part of the plot. Yes, she wrote the note, but Murillo's secretary caught her doing it, Murillo confined her, and then awaited Garcia's move, killing him. Miss Burnet's real name is Mrs. Victor Durando. Her late husband was from San Pedro, its ambassador to Britain and a potential political rival to Murillo. Murillo had him recalled and shot so that he could not pose a threat to Murillo's position.

Murillo and his Secretary give the police the slip in London, and resurface in Madrid under new aliases. However, they are both murdered, and their killers are never caught.

Commentary
Out of the entire collection of Holmes stories by Doyle, this is the only story in which a police inspector (specifically, Inspector Baynes) is as competent as Holmes. Holmes has nothing but praise for Inspector Baynes, believing that he will rise high in his profession, for he has instinct and intuition. Inspector Lestrade rarely received this kind of appreciation from Holmes. It comes out that Baynes had only arrested the cook to draw out Henderson so he would think he was no longer under suspicion.

San Pedro is a fictitious country; its colours are green and white, explaining one part of the cryptic note.

Publication history
"The Adventure of Wisteria Lodge" was first published in the US in Collier's on 15 August 1908, and in the UK in The Strand Magazine in September–October 1908. In the Strand, the story was published in two parts: "The Singular Experience of Mr. John Scott Eccles" and "The Tiger of San Pedro". The story was published with six illustrations by Frederic Dorr Steele in Collier's, and with ten illustrations by Arthur Twidle in the Strand. It was included in the short story collection His Last Bow, which was published in the UK and the US in October 1917.

Adaptations

Film and television
A short silent film titled The Tiger of San Pedro (1921) was based on the story. It was one of the short films in the Sherlock Holmes film series by Stoll Pictures, and starred Eille Norwood as Sherlock Holmes and Hubert Willis as Dr. Watson.
The story was adapted for the 1968 BBC series with Peter Cushing. The episode is now lost.
The Granada TV adaption with Jeremy Brett followed the original story with a few exceptions.  There is no mention of any of the voodoo relics in Wisteria Lodge, and it is Watson who gives chase to the cook, not the constable.  Also, at the end, "The Tiger of San Pedro" and his accomplice are not killed in a Madrid hotel, but instead by Garcia's two surviving compatriots with Garcia's brace of pistols on a train while Murillo is fleeing to escape Holmes and the law.
In the NHK puppet show Sherlock Holmes, it is Gordon Lestrade, a member of the life guidance committee of Beeton School who has a "singular" experience. One day he chats with the pupils called Garcia and Henderson but he finds that they go missing the next morning. Baynes, a pupil who informs Holmes about the matter, tells him about their theft of bread from the food storehouse. The discovery of a dog toy in their room leads Holmes to uncover the truth. Kabuki sound effects are used in the episode.

Radio
The story was dramatised by Edith Meiser as a 1931 episode of the American radio series The Adventures of Sherlock Holmes, with Richard Gordon as Sherlock Holmes and Leigh Lovell as Dr. Watson. Other episodes based on the story aired in January 1935, with Louis Hector as Holmes and Lovell as Watson, and in September 1936, with Gordon as Holmes and Harry West as Watson.
Meiser also adapted the story for the American radio series The New Adventures of Sherlock Holmes, with Basil Rathbone as Holmes and Nigel Bruce as Watson. The episode aired in December 1939. Other episodes based on the story aired in 1943 and in 1947 (with Tom Conway as Holmes and Bruce as Watson).
"Wisteria Lodge" was adapted for the BBC Light Programme as part of the 1952–1969 radio series starring Carleton Hobbs as Holmes and Norman Shelley as Watson. The production was adapted by Michael Hardwick and aired on 26 December 1966.
"Wisteria Lodge" was dramatised for BBC Radio 4 in 1994 by Bert Coules as part of the 1989–1998 radio series starring Clive Merrison as Holmes and Michael Williams as Watson.
 In 2008, the story was adapted as an episode of The Classic Adventures of Sherlock Holmes, a series on the American radio show Imagination Theatre, with John Patrick Lowrie as Holmes and Lawrence Albert as Watson.

Music
 The story inspired the 1970s jazz song "The Tiger of San Pedro" by John LaBarbera, which was made popular by trombone superstar Bill Watrous.

References
Notes

Sources

External links

 

Wisteria Lodge, The Adventure of
1908 short stories
Works originally published in Collier's